Fan labor, also called fan works, are the creative activities engaged in by fans, primarily those of various media properties or musical groups. These activities can include creation of written works (fiction, fan fiction and review literature), visual or computer-assisted art, films and videos, animations, games, music, or applied arts and costuming.

Although fans invest significant time creating their products, and fan-created products are "often crafted with production values as high as any in the official culture," most fans provide their creative works as amateurs, for others to enjoy without requiring or requesting monetary compensation. Fans respect their gift economy culture and are often also fearful that charging other fans for products of their creativity will somehow fundamentally change the fan-fan relationship, as well as attract unwanted legal attention from copyright holders. The skills that fans hone through their fan works may be marketable, and some fans find employment through their fan works.

In recent years, media conglomerates have become more aware of how fan labor activities can add to and affect the effectiveness of media product development, marketing, advertising, promotional activities, and distribution. They seek to harness fan activities for low-cost and effective advertisements (such as the 2007 Doritos Super Bowl Ad contest) at the same time as they continue to send out cease and desist to the creators of amateur fan products—threatening legal action whose basis is increasingly being questioned by fandom rights groups like the Organization for Transformative Works, which assert the transformative and therefore legal nature of fan labor products.

In the fandom subgroups science fiction fandom and media fandom, fan labor activities may be termed fanac (from "fannish activities"), a term that also includes non-creative activities such as managing traditional science fiction fanzines (i.e., not primarily devoted to fan fiction), and the organization and maintenance of science fiction conventions and science fiction clubs.

A more general and internet focused form of "fan work" is user-generated content, which became popular with the Web 2.0, often also a form of virtual volunteering.

Categories of activities
Fans use all art forms to express their creativity with regard to their fandoms.

Literary arts: Fan fiction, reviews
Fan fiction is the most widely known fan labor practice, and arguably one of the oldest, beginning at least as early as the 17th century. Fan fiction stories ("fan fic") are literary works produced by fans of a given media property, rather than the original creator. They may expand on an original story line, character relationship, or situations and entities that were originally mentioned in the original author's work. Works of fan fiction are rarely commissioned or authorized by the original work's owner, creator, or publisher, and they are almost never professionally published.

The rise of online repositories built to archive and deliver fan fiction has resulted in a new activity: fandom analytics. This fan labor practice is focused on the analysis and visualization of the use of content tags and categories, along with other metrics, such as hit and word counts in order to discuss and forecast trends and variations within and across fandoms.

Traditional visual arts: Art and graphic design
Fan art is artwork based on a character, costume, item, or story that was created by someone other than the artist. Usually, it refers to fan labor artworks by amateur and unpaid artists. In addition to traditional paintings and drawings, fan artists may also create web banners, avatars, or web-based animations, as well as photo collages, posters, and artistic representation of movie/show/book quotes.

Computer-aided visual arts: Fan films, fan vids, fan games, machinima

A fan film is a film or video inspired by a media source, created by fans rather than by the source's copyright holders or creators. Fan films vary in length from short faux-teaser trailers for non-existent motion pictures to ultra-rare full-length motion pictures.

Fanvids are analytical music videos made by synchronizing clips from TV shows or movies with music to tell a story or make an argument. "Vidders", the creators of these videos, carefully match the audio and video components to tell a story or set a specific mood.

Fangames are video games made by fans based on one or more established video games; the vast majority of fangames that have been successfully completed and published are adventure games. Many fangames attempt to clone the original game's design, gameplay and characters, but it is equally common for fans to develop a unique game using another only as a template. Fangames are either developed as standalone games with their own engines, or as modifications to existing games that "piggyback" on the other's engines.

Fans of video games have been creating machinima since 1996. Machinima creators use computer game engines to create "actors" and create scenarios for them to perform in, using the physics and character generation tools of the game. The scripts, as performed by the computer-generated characters, are recorded and distributed to viewers online.

Reanimated collaborations involve each fan animating a shot of an existing film in their own unique style. The clips are then stitched together to produce a collaborative tribute, sometimes with over 500 animators on a single film. The finished product is then uploaded to the internet for other fans to watch. Reanimated projects have been produced in honor of Shrek, SpongeBob, The Simpsons, Kirby, and Zelda CDi, among others. Participants generally expect little or no profit.

Fan labor in the software domain, especially for video games, exists also in the form of fan patches, fan translations, mods, fan-made remakes, server emulators and source ports.

Musical arts: Filking
Filk is a musical culture, genre, and community tied to science fiction/fantasy fandom, involving the writing and performance of songs inspired by fandom and other common filk themes. Filking is often done in small groups at conventions, often late at night after other official convention programming has ended for the day; additionally, there are now dedicated filk conventions in Canada, England, Germany, and the USA.

Some fandoms are known to produce music as a form of fan labor that is not usually classified as filk.

Applied arts: Costume construction, tea blending
In costuming or cosplay, creators assemble and sew costumes that replicate characters or fit with the setting of the target of fannish activity. Costuming often goes well beyond basic seamstress and tailoring, and may include developing sophisticated mechanics, such as hydraulics to open and close wings, or complicated manufacturing techniques, such as building Stormtrooper armor from scratch by using vacuum molding and fiberglass application.

In fandom-inspired tea blends, creators craft unique combinations of teas, herbs, nuts, fruits, and/or spices to produce a blend that typifies a character from TV, film, or comic books or exemplifies their nature, or an aspect of it. Fan art is typically involved in the form of a custom designed label. NPR reports this started in 2012 and there are now "more than a thousand user-created 'fandom teas'" available.

Economic theories and models
Having invested significant amounts of time, most fans provide their creative works for others to enjoy without requiring or requesting monetary compensation. Most fans are engaged in an economic model that rewards labor with "credit" such as attribution, notoriety, and good will, rather than money.

Gift economy
The most common formal economic model associated with fan labor practices is a gift economy. In the social sciences, a gift economy is a society where valuable goods and services are regularly given without any explicit agreement for immediate or future rewards (i.e. no formal quid pro quo exists). Ideally, simultaneous or recurring giving serves to circulate and redistribute valuables within the community.

The gift economy manifests in fan labor practices through the writing and posting of a story (the gift given/exchanged), followed by the reading of the story (gift acceptance, completing the initial exchange), and finally, feedback to the original author and potentially passing the work along or linking to it for others to see (the reciprocal gift given).

The gift can also be surplus labor made in excess of the labor necessary from the worker, created not for other fans but rather to compel the original media property to notice their indebtedness and do something for the fans in return. These gifts are like offerings made to show the original producers that there is a lively fandom for their product, and possibly encourage the producers to make more. This was the case with the fans of the Firefly TV series, who engaged in very visible fan activities, such as charity events, "guerrilla marketing" activities, creation of fan videos, and filk in order to successfully convince a studio to green-light a movie sequel to the canceled TV series.

The organization of a gift economy stands in contrast to a barter economy or a market economy. The gift economy of fandom is seen by many fans as a central tenet of "what makes fandom different".

Relationships between fans
Instead of monetary reward, one of the major rewards of fan labor is the formation of relationships between fan creators and other fans.  The relationships created through fan exchanges are often as important, if not more so, than the products exchanged. The focus on relationships separates fandom economic practices from the capitalistic practices of everyday life.

From an economic anthropology viewpoint, the products of fan labor are a form of cultural wealth, valuable also for their ability to interrelate the fan works, the fan-creators, and the original media property itself through conversation and fan work exchanges. Fans, in other words, are "affines" of media property and of other fans.

Deification of media property owner
From another economic anthropology perspective, fan creative practices are labor that is done in a relatively routine way and that helps to maintain a connection to the media property itself (the "cultural ancestor" or "deity"). Through their fan labor, fans are able to replicate "the original creative acts of first-principle deities, ancestors or cultural heroes".

Ritual anthropology
Fans engage in skilled crafting, "routine acts" within a ritual economy. The types of material that fans produce and consume continually reproduce the structures and worldview of the fandom subset of the authors and readers, for instance, in terms of which ships are popular. These choices also reflect the relationships fans construct of their view of their place within fandom, including how they relate to the media property and the corporate structures and products surrounding it. Fans are therefore engaged in "the individual and collective construction of overlapping and even conflicting practices, identities, meanings, and also alternate texts, images, and objects".

The goods that fans produce as a result of these rituals are imbued with social value by other fans. Fan works are valued as fandom products, and they also support the fan creator's desire to be valued by peers.

Fan products and money
There is a divide in fandom between those who want to see new models of remuneration developed and those who feel that "getting paid cuts fandom off at the knees".

For example, Rebecca Tushnet fears that "if fan productions became well-recognized gateways to legitimate fame and fortune, there might be a tradeoff between monetary and community-based incentives to create." By contrast, Abigail De Kosnik suggests that, since fans are inevitably part of a monetary economy in some way or another, fans should be able to profit from the people who are profiting from them.

Ambivalence regarding monetary compensation
Fans who do their creative work out of paying respect to the original media property or an actor or to the fandom in general gain cultural capital in the fandom. However, those who attempt to sell their creative products will be shunned by other fans, and subject to possible legal action. Fans often classify other fans trying to sell their items for profit motives as "hucksters" rather than true fans.

Fans are often also fearful that charging other fans for products of their creativity, such as zines, videos, costumes, art, etc. will somehow fundamentally change the fan-fan relationship, as well as attract unwanted legal attention from copyright holders. That fear has come true in more than one case, such as the removal from sale on Amazon.com of Another Hope, a commercial fan fiction book set in the Star Wars universe.

However, some fans engage in for-profit exchange of their creations in what is known as the "gray market". The gray market operates mainly through word of mouth and "under the table" sales, and provides products of varying quality. Even though these are commercial activities, it is still expected that fan vendors will not make a large amount of profit, charging just enough to cover expenses. Some vendors attempt to not mark up their products at all, and will use that information in their promotional information, in an attempt to secure the confidence of other fans who may look down at fans making a profit.

Fan art is one exception, in that artists have traditionally sold their works in public at conventions and other fan gatherings, as well as on their own web sites. Many fan artists have set up e-commerce storefronts through vendors such as CafePress and Zazzle, which allow customers to purchase items such as t-shirts, totes, and mugs with the fan design imprinted on them.

Filking has also become more commercialized, with several filkers (The Great LukeSki, Voltaire, The Bedlam Bards, etc.) producing and selling filk cassettes, CDs and DVDs of their performances.

Third party marketplaces
Some companies purchase fan-created additions or game items. Other companies run marketplaces for fans to sell these items to other fans for monetary reward.

Conglomerates and fans
Jenkins comments on the fan-media conglomerate relationship, saying, "Here, the right to participate in the culture is assumed to be 'the freedom we have allowed ourselves,' not a privilege granted by a benevolent company, not something they [fans] are prepared to barter away for better sound files or free Web hosting. [….] Instead, they embrace an understanding of intellectual property as 'shareware,' something that accrues value as it moves across different contexts, gets retold in various ways, attracts multiple audiences, and opens itself up to a proliferation of alternative meanings."

However, this state of affairs may not last as companies become more aware of how fan labor activities can add to and affect the effectiveness of media product development, marketing, advertising, promotional activities, and distribution. A business report called The Future of Independent Media stated, "The media landscape will be reshaped by the bottom-up energy of media created by amateurs and hobbyists as a matter of course [….] A new generation of media makers and viewers are [sic] emerging which could lead to a sea change in how media is made and consumed." The 2007 book Consumer Tribes is devoted to case studies of consumer groups, many of them media fans, who are challenging the traditional media production and consumer product marketing models.

Companies, however, react to fan activities in very different ways. While some companies actively court fans and these type of activities (sometimes limited to ways delineated by the company itself), other companies attempt to highly restrict them.

Full support of fan activities
The payments to fan creators of content that is used in upgrades to the model train simulator Trainz is an example of an original copyright owner being willing to share the potential commercial gain to be made from derivative works by fans.

In Japan, doujinshi is often sold side by side with its original commercial inspiration, with no legal action from the original publishers.

Co-opting fan activities
Companies are now building in room for participation and improvisation, allowing fans to essentially color-by-number with franchise approval. Some, however, disagree that it is good practice for corporations to engage in and encourage fan activities. Stephen Brown, in his article for Consumer Tribes, Harry Potter and the Fandom Menace, writes, "Fans, furthermore, are atypical. [….] They are not representative, not even remotely. Their enthusiastically put views are hopelessly distorted, albeit hopelessly distorted in a direction marketers find congenial. Isn't it great to gather eager followers? [….] The answer, in a nutshell, is NO."

Additionally, some corporations co-opt user-generated content as "free labor". As fans recognize the commercial value of their labor, the issue of companies abusing these volunteer creators of videos, stories, and advertisements (such as the 2007 Doritos Super Bowl Ad contest) by not providing an appropriate monetary reward is of concern.

Eliminating fan activities
In recent years, copyright holders have increasingly sent cease and desist letters to vendors and authors, as well as requests for back licensing fees or other fines for copyright violations. Often, these cases are settled out of court, but usually result in the fan vendor having to stop selling products entirely, or significantly modifying their wares to comply with the copyright owner's demands.

Legal issues

Most fan labor products are derivative works, in that they are creative additions or modifications to an existing copyrighted work, or they are original creations which are inspired by a specific copyrighted work.  Some or all of these works may fall into the legal category of transformative works (such as a parody of the original), which is protected as fair use under U.S. copyright law.  However, corporations continue to ask fans to stop engaging with their products in creative ways.

Support for fans
Fan labor products may be protected by the Fair Use Doctrine of the U.S. Copyright Law, which judges if a work is copyright-infringing based on four tests:
the purpose and character of the use, including whether such use is of a commercial nature or is for nonprofit educational purposes;
the nature of the copyrighted work;
the amount and substantiality of the portion used in relation to the copyrighted work as a whole; and
the effect of the use upon the potential market for or value of the copyrighted work.
However, these tests are not absolute, and judges may decide to weigh one factor more heavily than another in any given case.

Although some fan artists receive cease and desist letters or find themselves running afoul of copyright law, they may argue that their "artistic interpretation" of a character or scenario makes it a transformative work upheld by the fair use doctrine.

The Organization for Transformative Works is a fan-run organization that advocates for the transformative nature of fan fiction and provides legal advice for fan fiction writers, vidders, and other fan labor practitioners.

Chilling Effects is a joint web project of the Electronic Frontier Foundation and Harvard, Stanford, Berkeley, University of San Francisco, University of Maine, George Washington School of Law, and Santa Clara University School of Law clinics, which covers the current state of copyright-related law suits, and has a special section devoted to fan fiction legal action and how to fight it.

Some copyright holders view fan work as free publicity, permitting them to the maximum extent.

Copyright holders fight fans
Recent years have seen increasing legal action from media conglomerates, who are actively protecting their intellectual property rights. Because of new technologies that make media easier to distribute and modify, fan labor activities are coming under greater scrutiny. Some fans are finding themselves the subjects of cease and desist letters which ask them to take down the offending materials from a website, or stop distributing or selling an item which the corporation believes violates their copyright. As a result of these actions by media companies, some conventions now ban fan art entirely from their art shows, even if not offered for sale, and third party vendors may remove offending designs from their websites.

See also
 Fan art
 Fan film
 Fan patch
 Fan translation
 Fangame
 Fansub
 Free software movement—similar subculture based around free labor with some overlaps with fan labor
 Remix culture

References

Works cited
Appadurai, Arjun (1986) The social life of things: Commodities in cultural perspective. Cambridge: Cambridge University Press.
Brown, Stephen (2007) "Harry Potter and the Fandom Menace". In Consumer Tribes, B. Cova, R.V. Kozinets and A. Shankar, eds. pp. 177–193. Oxford, Elsevier.
Clerc, Susan (2002) Who Owns Our Culture? The Battle Over the Internet, Copyright, Media Fandom, and Everyday Uses of the Cultural Commons. Dissertation, Bowling Green State University. Ann Arbor, MI: ProQuest Information and Learning Co.
Coppa, Francesca (2007) "A Brief History of Media Fandom". In Fan Fiction and Fan Communities in the Age of the Internet, K. Hellekson and K. Busse, eds. pp. 5–32. London, McFarland.
Cova, Bernard, Robert V. Kozinets and Avi Shankar (2007) Consumer Tribes. Oxford, Elsevier.
De Kosnik, Abigail (2009) Should Fan Fiction Be Free?.  In Cinema Journal 48:118 (2009).
Deuze, Mark (2007) Media Work. Cambridge, Polity Press.
Fiske, John (1992) "The Cultural Economy of Fandom". In The Adoring Audience, Lisa A. Lewis, ed. pp. 30–49. London, Routledge.
Gray, Jonathan, Cornel Sandvoss and C. Lee Harrington (2007) Fandom: Identities and Communities in a Mediated World. New York, New York University Press.
Hellekson, Karen and Kristina Busse (2006) "Introduction: Work in Progress". In Fan Fiction and Fan Communities in the Age of the Internet, K. Hellekson and K. Busse, eds. pp. 5–32. London, McFarland.
Helms, Mary W. (1998)"Tangible Durability". In Access to Origins: Affines, Ancestors, and Aristocrats. M.W. Helms, ed. pp. 164–173. Austin: University of Texas Press.
Isaac, Barry L. (1993) "Retrospective on the Formalist-Substantivist Debate". Research in Economic Anthropology 14:213–233.
Jenkins, Henry (2007a) Fans, Bloggers, and Gamers: Exploring Participatory Culture. New York, New York University Press.
Jenkins, Henry (2007b) "Afterword: The Future of Fandom".In Fandom: Identities and Communities in a Mediated World. J. Gray, C. Sandvoss and C.L. Harrington, eds. pp. 357–364. New York, New York University Press.
Jenkins, Henry (2006) Convergence Culture: Where Old and New Media Collide. New York, New York University Press.
Keen, Andrew (2007) The Cult of the Amateur: How Today's Internet is Killing Our Culture. New York, Doubleday.
Kozinets, Robert V. (2007) "Inno-tribes: Star Trek as wikimedia". In Consumer Tribes, B. Cova, R.V. Kozinets and A. Shankar, eds. pp. 177–193. Oxford, Elsevier.
 
Mauss, Marcel (1990) The Gift: The Form and Reason for Exchange in Archaic Societies. W.D. Halls, transl. London: Routledge.
MacDonald, Heidi (2006) "Star Wars POD Fan Fiction Flap". in Publishers Weekly; May 1, 2006, 253, 18. p. 6.
Polanyi, Karl (1957) "The Economy as Instituted Process". In Trade and market in the Early Empires: Economies in History and Theory. C.M.A. K. Polanyi, H.W. Pearson, ed. pp. 243–270. Glencoe, Illinois: The Free Press.
Thorne, Scott and Gordon C. Bruner (2006) "An exploratory investigation of the characteristics of consumer fanaticism". Qualitative Market Research; 2006; 9, 1. p. 51.
Thorsby, David (2001) "Introduction". In Economics and Culture. pp. 1–18. Cambridge, UK: Cambridge University Press.
Tushnet, Rebecca (2004) "Copy This Essay: How Fair Use Doctrine Harms Free Speech and How Copying Serves It". In The Yale Law Journal. 114(3):535–590. .
Tushnet, Rebecca (2007) "http://scholarship.law.duke.edu/cgi/viewcontent.cgi?article=1424&context=lcp Payment in Credit: Copyright Law and Subcultural Creativity". In Law & Contemporary Problems. 70:135–174.
Wells, E. Christian and Karla Davis-Salazar (2007) "Mesoamerican Ritual Economy: Materialization as Ritual and Economic Process". In Mesoamerican Ritual Economy: Archaeological and Ethnological Perspectives, E. C. Wells and K. L. Davis-Salazar, eds. pp. 1–26.  Boulder, University Press of Colorado.
Wilk, Richard R. and Lisa C. Cliggett (2007) Economies and Cultures: Foundations of Economic Anthropology. Boulder, Colorado: Westview Press.
Woo, Jisuk (2004) "Redefining the 'Transformative Use' of Copyrighted Works: Toward a Fair Use Standard in the Digital Environment". In Hastings Communications and Law Journal. Retrieved from Lexis-Nexis service, University of South Florida Library.

External links
Coverage of the Harry Potter Lexicon Trial

 
Articles containing video clips